Smodicini is a tribe of beetles in the subfamily Cerambycinae, containing the following genera and species:

Genera
According to BioLib:
 Afrosmodicum Martins, 1975
 Caediscum Lefkovitch, 1962
 Holorusius Fairmaire, 1898
 Luscosmodicum Martins, 1970
 Marupiara Martins & Galileo, 2006
 Metaphrenon Martins, 1975
 Morettus Adlbauer, 2007
 Nesosmodicum Martins, 1971
 Pseudossibia Adlbauer, 2005
 Smodicum Haldeman, 1847

Selected species
 Luscosmodicum beaveri Martins, 1970
 Genus Marupiara
 Marupiara castanea Martins & Galileo, 2006
 Genus Metaphrenon
 Metaphrenon impressicolle (Lacordaire, 1869)
 Metaphrenon lucidum (Olivier, 1795)
 Genus Nesosmodicum
 Nesosmodicum gracile (Melzer, 1923)
 Genus Smodicum
 Smodicum angusticolle Aurivillius, 1919
 Smodicum brunneum Thomson, 1878
 Smodicum clancularium Martins, 1975
 Smodicum confusum Martins, 1985
 Smodicum cucujiforme (Say, 1826)
 Smodicum depressum Thomson, 1878
 Smodicum dinellii Bruch, 1911
 Smodicum longicorne Martins, 1975
 Smodicum pacificum Linsley, 1934
 Smodicum parandroides Bates, 1884
 Smodicum recticolle Martins, 1975
 Smodicum semipubescens Gounelle, 1911
 Smodicum texanum Knull, 1966
 Smodicum torticolle Martins, 1975

References

Cerambycinae